Cohors [prima] Flavia Commagenorum [quingenaria] equitata sagittaria? ("[1st] part-mounted [500 strong] cohort of Commagenes") was a Roman auxiliary regiment containing cavalry contingents. The cohort stationed in Dacia at castra Acidava, castra Jidava, castra Romula, castra of Sfârleanca, castra of Slăveni and castra of Drajna de Sus.

See also 
 List of Roman auxiliary regiments

References
 Academia Română: Istoria Românilor, Vol. 2, Daco-romani, romanici, alogeni, 2nd. Ed., București, 2010, 
 Constantin C. Petolescu: Dacia - Un mileniu de istorie, Ed. Academiei Române, 2010, 
 Cristian M. Vlădescu: Fortificațiile romane din Dacia Inferior, Craiova, 1986
 Petru Ureche: Tactică, strategie și specific de luptă la cohortele equitate din Dacia Romană

Military of ancient Rome
Auxiliary equitata units of ancient Rome
Roman Dacia